Fife was a county constituency represented in the House of Commons of the Parliament of the United Kingdom from 1708 until 1885, when it was divided into East Fife and West Fife.

Creation
The British parliamentary constituency was created in 1708 following the Acts of Union, 1707 and replaced the former Parliament of Scotland shire constituency of Fifeshire.

History
The constituency elected one Member of Parliament (MP) by the first past the post system until the seat was divided in 1885.

Boundaries
The constituency covered the county of Fife.

Members of Parliament

Election results

Elections in the 1830s

Elections in the 1840s

Elections in the 1850s

Elections in the 1860s
Wemyss's death caused a by-election.

Elections in the 1870s

Elections in the 1880s

References 

Historic parliamentary constituencies in Scotland (Westminster)
Constituencies of the Parliament of the United Kingdom established in 1708
Constituencies of the Parliament of the United Kingdom disestablished in 1885